Ørnes Chapel is a chapel of the Church of Norway in Meløy Municipality in Nordland county, Norway.  It is located in the village of Ørnes. It is an annex chapel in the Fore og Meløy parish which is part of the Bodø domprosti (deanery) in the Diocese of Sør-Hålogaland. The white, wooden chapel was built in a long church style in 1990. The chapel seats about 300 people as well as houses the parish offices.

See also
List of churches in Sør-Hålogaland

References

Meløy
Churches in Nordland
Wooden churches in Norway
20th-century Church of Norway church buildings
Churches completed in 1990
1990 establishments in Norway
Long churches in Norway